Marion Mitchell, Lady Davis (19 October 1876 – 5 May 1955) was a New Zealand singer. She was born in Wellington, New Zealand on 19 October 1876. She married Ernest Davis in 1899, who later became Mayor of Auckland.

References

1876 births
1955 deaths
20th-century New Zealand women singers
Wives of knights